Ramin Guliyev (born 22 June 1981) is an Azerbaijani football manager and former player who played as a defender. He is currently the manager of the Azerbaijan U17, and a former player of Azerbaijan. He  was a former player of Dinamo Baku, which was eliminated in expect.

Career

International
Guliyev made 17 appearances for the senior Azerbaijan national football team since his debut on 17 August 2005.

Managerial career
On 13 December 2017, Guliyev was appointed as manager of Azerbaijan U17.

Career statistics

Club

International

Statistics accurate as of match played 2 February 2008

Honours
Shafa Baku
Azerbaijan Cup (1): 2000-01

Neftchi Baku
Azerbaijan Premier League (1): 2003–04
Azerbaijan Cup (1): 2003-04

Baku
Azerbaijan Premier League (1): 2005–06
Azerbaijan Cup (1): 2004–05

References

External links
 
 

Living people
1981 births
Association football defenders
Azerbaijani footballers
Azerbaijan international footballers
Azerbaijani football managers
AZAL PFK players
Gabala FC players
Neftçi PFK players